Bradford Elementary School is the name of several elementary schools:

In Canada:
 Bradford Public School (Bradford, Ontario), operated by Simcoe County District School Board

In the United States:
 Bradford Elementary School (Bradford, Maine) 
 Bradford Elementary School (Bradford, Rhode Island), operated by Westerly Public Schools
 Bradford Elementary School (Bradford, Tennessee)
 Bradford Elementary School (Bradford, Vermont), operated by Bradford Academy & Graded School District
 Bradford Elementary School (Upper Montclair, New Jersey), operated by Montclair Public Schools
 Bradford Public School (Pueblo, Colorado), operated by Pueblo School District 60
 Bradford Primary School and Bradford Intermediate School (Littleton, Colorado), Operated by Jefferson County Public Schools
 West Bradford Elementary School, operated by the Downingtown Area School District